An ammunition belt is a firearm device used to package and feed cartridges, typically for rapid-firing automatic weapons such as machine guns.  Belt-fed systems minimize the proportional weight of the ammunition apparatus to the entire weapon system, and allow high rates of continuous fire without needing frequent magazine changes.  The capacity of belts and associated belt containers is typically a function of weight and bulk, and their size is limited by caliber and the combined portability of the weapon and ammunition.  The most common ammo capacity typically carried on a man-portable weapon system vary from 50 to 300 rounds.

Variants

Feed strip 

The "feed strip" (also referred to as an "ammo strip" or "feed tray") was initially designed in 1895, based on initial designs by Captain Baron Adolf Odkolek von Ujezda of Vienna, Austria. A feed strip is a simple rigid metal (usually steel or brass) tray with typically 24 to 30 cartridges crimped together into a row. The feed strip is loaded into the side of the gun and as the cartridges are stripped off and fired from the weapon, the tray gradually moves to the other side until it falls out when it is empty, whereupon a new one is inserted. In this regard, it is similar to an En-bloc clip. The "feed strip" loading system was pioneered by the Hotchkiss machine gun designs, most notably the Hotchkiss M1914 machine gun. The Hotchkiss guns were used by major militaries such as the United States, the United Kingdom and the French throughout the duration of the first World War and slightly afterwards. However, the feed strip mechanisms lived on through other militaries, most notably the Italian-designed Breda M37 and the Japanese-designed Type 3 and Type 92 machine guns, which were used up until the end of the Second World War.

Articulated "strip" 

Though the feed strips were replaced by most militaries by machine guns using either belts or magazines, the Hotchkiss feed strip design actually pioneered an early 50-round belt mechanism, made up of articulated pieces of metal folded together, resembling feed strips. The articulated Hotchkiss belt design also dates back to 1896.

Disintegrating 

Many modern ammunition belts use disintegrating links. Disintegrating links retain a single round and are articulated with the round ahead of it in the belt.  When the round ahead is stripped from the belt and fed into the feed system or chamber, the link holding it is ejected and the link holding the following round is disarticulated. Many disintegrating belt designs allow two pieces of belt to be connected by a cartridge, it applies even to non-disintegrating belts. When done by assistant gunner in combat, linking a new belt to the end of the belt already being fed in the weapon allows for continuous fire without the need to open the feed tray and reload.

Non-disintegrating 

This type of belt consists of a design that can be reused, as it does not fall apart during function, similar to a feed strip. This is found only on a few types of machine guns, such as the Soviet DShK, RPD, PK, the Russian RPL-20, PKP Pecheneg, the German MG 34, MG 42, MG 3, Chinese QJY-88, and the British Vickers, which used a non-disintegrating canvas and brass belt. Arguably, precursors to the belt-fed machine gun were the Cass rifle, patented in 1848, and the Treeby chain gun, patented in the 1850s. Belts were originally composed of canvas or cloth with pockets spaced evenly to allow the belt to be mechanically fed into the gun.  These designs were prone to malfunctions due to the effects of oil and other contaminants altering the belt. If they became saturated with water, canvas belts including the loops holding the cartridges would contract, and the gun mechanism would be unable to extract the rounds. Later belt designs used permanently connected metal links to hold the cartridges, and weapons which originally used textile belts such as the Vickers Gun were then deployed with these more dependable formats. These belts were more tolerant to exposure to solvents and oil. Despite it being a more efficient system, few are still used, possibly due to the added cost and effort. Non-disintegrating belts often come in pieces of limited length connected by disintegrating link, and after being fed through the weapon the piece falls off, limiting the length of the used belt hanging from the weapon to no more than one such piece. Many weapons designed to use non-disintegrating or canvas belts are provided with machines to automatically reload these belts with loose rounds or rounds held in stripper clips. In use during World War I, reloaders allowed ammunition belts to be recycled quickly to allow practically continuous fire.

Feed variants

Pull out – Push through 
Most often required by cloth belts, hence found on mostly early machine guns. The pull out – push through cartridge feed system has the cartridge withdrawn from the belt to the rear, then pushed directly forward into the barrel. Examples are the Darne mle 1922, Browning 1919, Browning M2HB, Maxim and Vickers. Among the modern machine guns using this system are the PK family, where its use is favored due to the rim of the 7.62×54mmR cartridge, which makes it more complicated to eject the round forward from the belt (although not impossible, see the UK vz. 59 for an example of a push through GPMG using the same round).

Push through 
Found on mostly modern machine guns. The push through cartridge feed system has the cartridge pushed directly forward into the barrel. Examples are the non-disintegrating Patronengurt 33, 34, or 34/41 used by the  MG 34 and MG 42 and the derived Patronengurt DM1 used by the MG 3 whose feeding systems were based on the direct push-through of the cartridge out of the link into the gun's chamber. Accordingly, the link had to be of the half-open type to enable the motion of the bolt through the link. Many modern machine guns use or can use the disintegrating half-open type 7.62×51mm NATO  M13 link or 5.56×45mm NATO M27 link.

External 
Some weapons such as the M134 Minigun and related designs use a hybrid mechanism to strip rounds from disintegrating belts into a linkless feed system or a specialized delinker to allow for more reliable feeding at extreme rates of fire. Modern infantry machine guns often have feed systems allowing the use of linked ammunition as well as other forms of feed like from magazines or drums. In some instances—like the FN Minimi/M249 SAW and the IMI Negev—the feed system requires no modification to fire with either mechanism. Other designs—like the Heckler and Koch HK21-based designs or MG34—require the exchange of modular parts to allow belt or alternate feeding. Due to the lack of protection provided by the belt, belt-fed infantry weapons typically use a flexible or rigid container to retain the belt on the weapon. In some designs—like the MG3—the belt container appears to be a magazine causing some confusion to people unfamiliar with the design.

Container device 

Flexible belts tend to hang downwards with gravity and randomly  whip around with recoil during continuous firing, which can sometimes kink/twist and cause feeding malfunctions.  Free-hanging belts can also get dirty/messy with exposure to the elements, be clumsy to handle, and entangle to other objects especially when the shooter tries to maneuver around.  To minimize such issues, ammunition belts are sometimes carried in container devices designed to be attached to the firearm either by inserting like a drum magazine or just conveniently mounting to the side (for larger weapon systems).  When loading ammunition, one end of the belt is pulled out of an opening on the container and inserted into the gun normally, and the belt progresses out of the container in a controlled fashion.  These containers also often have a supporting/guiding bar which enables the belt to enter the weapon at an optimal (more perpendicular) angle, rather than bending down more acutely.

See also 

 Bandolier
 Clip
 Magazine
 Stripper clip

Notable firearm belts
 M1 link
 M13 link
 M27 link

References

External links
 How's It Made: A Giant Machine That Makes MG Links Forgotten Weapons

Firearm components